Ikpeazu is an Igbo surname. Notable people with the name include:
Okezie Ikpeazu (born October 18, 1964), Nigerian politician
Lynda Chuba-Ikpeazu (born June 22, 1966), Nigerian politician
Uche Ikpeazu (born February 28, 1995), English footballer

Igbo-language surnames